The NSV (Russian НСВ Никитина-Соколова-Волкова), also known as the «Utyos» (Project: Lonely Cliff), is a 12.7mm caliber heavy machine gun of Soviet origin, named after the designers, G. I. Nikitin (Г. И. Никитин), Y. М. Sokolov (Ю. М. Соколов) and V. I. Volkov (В. И. Волков). It was designed to replace the DShK machine gun and was adopted by the Soviet Army in 1971. It is no longer being produced in Russia; the manufacturing license for the NSV ended up in Kazakhstan after the break-up of the Soviet Union. The NSV has been manufactured in Bulgaria, India, Poland and Yugoslavia under license.

A loaded ammunition belt with 50 rounds  weighs .

The NSVT version is used on the T-72, T-64 and T-80 tanks.

The new Kord machine gun has replaced worn-out NSVs in some countries.

History
The Soviet Army began looking for a new heavy machine gun to replace its older SGM and DShK machine guns in the early 1950s. The Soviet Army liked the idea behind the German MG 42; a versatile weapon used on a variety of mounts to perform many different roles. Two Soviet weapon designers were asked to design one weapon each utilizing the same principle.

Testing approved Mikhail Kalashnikov's solution; it was found to be more reliable and cheaper to manufacture than the design of Grigory Nikitin and Yuri Sokolov. Kalashnikov's machine gun became the new standard machine gun, and was named PK.

Nikitin's and Sokolov's design was however not forgotten. It was developed into the heavy NSV machine gun about 10 years later and selected in 1969 as the successor to the DShK/DShKM machine gun. It was accepted in service by the Soviet Army in 1971. The machine gun was also license-manufactured in Bulgaria, India, Yugoslavia and Poland. The Yugoslavian version of the NSVT is called the M87.

Production of the NSV has ended in Russia, and it is currently being replaced by the Kord heavy machine gun. The Russian Army needed a more accurate heavy machine gun, and it has also been increasingly difficult to get hold of spare parts. NSV production was located in Ukraine and in Kazakhstan and was disrupted by the end of the Soviet Union.

Use in Finland
The NSV is called 12,7 Itkk 96 or 12,7 ilmatorjuntakonekivääri 96 (12,7 anti-aircraft machine gun 96) in Finland. It is often used as a vehicle-mounted machine gun, and can be seen on the Pasi armoured personnel carrier, the Nasu transport vehicle and the Leopard 2R tank.

Due to its high rate of fire, the NSV is intended to be used as a close-range anti-aircraft weapon against helicopters, UAVs and aircraft. In dismounted ground combat it is placed on a special mount.

The Finnish Navy also uses the NSV in the anti-aircraft role, where it complements other unguided anti-aircraft weapons like the 23 ITK 95, Bofors 40 Mk3 or Bofors 57 Mk2 and Mk3.

Variants
  NSVS-12.7 (Russian > Nikitina-Sokolova-Volkova Stankovy 12.7 = "NSV-designed mounted 12.7mm machinegun"): Used on tripod mount.
  NSVT-12.7 (Russian > Nikitina-Sokolova-Volkova Tankovy 12.7 = "NSV-designed coaxial 12.7mm machinegun"): Used on T-72 and T-80 main battle tanks.
  12.7 Itkk 96: Finnish designation. Guns acquired from Soviet Union, Russia and Germany (Ex-Nationale Volksarmee).
  M87 NSVT: Serbian license built version by Zastava Arms. The M87 has seen use with the armies of the former Yugoslav states.
  NSW: Polish version, license built NSV.
  WKM-B: Polish version adapted for NATO-standard .50 BMG ammunition.
  KT-12.7: Ukrainian version.
  MG-U: Bulgarian version

Users
 : Produced by Arsenal 
 
 
 
 
 
 : Manufactured NSVT at Ordnance Factory Tiruchirappalli of the Ordnance Factories Board.
  
 
 : Locally produced by Western Kazakhstan Machine-Building Company (ZKMK)
 : Mounted and used on M-84 tanks
 
 :Used by UNGERIN
 : Used by Namibian Marine Corps
 
 : Manufactured at ZM Tarnów as NSW. Poland also developed their own machine gun based on NSV and chambered to .50 BMG NATO round, known as WKM-B.
 
 : Manufactured at Zastava Arms. Copies were produced as the M02 Coyote
 
 : Mounted and used on T-80U tanks.
 
 
 
 : Produced locally by Z111 Factory.
 : Produced locally by Zastava Arms.

See also

 List of firearms
 List of Russian weaponry

References
 

12.7×108 mm machine guns
.50 BMG machine guns
Machine guns of the Soviet Union
Heavy machine guns of Russia
TsKIB SOO products
Weapons and ammunition introduced in 1971